Mount Kilimanjaro (/ˌkɪlɪmənˈdʒɑːroʊ/) is a dormant volcano (5,895 metres (19,341 ft) above sea level) in the United Republic of Tanzania.

There are several routes by which to reach Kibo, or Uhuru Peak, the highest summit of Mount Kilimanjaro, namely: Marangu, Rongai, Lemosho, Shira, Umbwe and Machame.

Being one of the most popular mountains in the world, roughly 50,000  trekkers every year try to reach the summit of Mt Kilimanjaro. According to research published by the Climb Kilimanjaro Guide, the average summit success rate across all climbers and routes is 65%. However, summit success rate heavily depends upon what route is climbed as routes vary considerably in terms of acclimatization profile and duration of the climb.

Climbing description 

The trek to Uhuru Peak is considered to be a relatively straightforward endeavour; however, ample time must still be provided for proper acclimatization to prevent altitude sickness. The three shortest routes, Marangu, Rongai, and Machame, are less challenging and are often trekked by individuals with limited mountaineering experience. Some trekkers employ altitude-sickness medication, including acetazolamide, but taking at least seven days at high altitude is the best way to avoid altitude sickness, as the body needs proper time to adapt and acclimatize to high altitude.

Route travel times range from five to nine days to summit and return to the base of the mountain. Huts with cooking facilities, bathrooms, and electricity are available on the Marangu route, and camps with fewer facilities are available on many other routes. All huts and many camps have rangers stationed at them with rescue facilities (modified wheelbarrows to transport trekkers stricken with altitude sickness to lower altitudes).

Trekkers on Mount Kilimanjaro typically have a support crew of guides and porters who are integral in helping climbers reach the summit. The size of the support crew depends on the number of trekkers in a group and is regulated by the Kilimanjaro National Park (KINAPA). Tour operators are expected to comply with KINAPA guide and porter regulations. A typical climbing group of 2 trekkers will have one guide, one assistant guide, 6 porters (3 for each climber) and one cook. Porters are responsible for carrying a trekkers gear as well as key items like tents, water and cooking supplies. It is customary to tip guides and porters at the last meal on the mountain or at the end of the trip. The tipping value varies depending on the number of days spent on the mountain and the number of climbers in a group.

Summit attempts are generally begun at midnight so that trekkers can reach the rim of the crater to view the sunrise. Walking overnight also means the ground (loose gravel) is frozen, making the going significantly easier.

Trekkers on the Marangu route first encounter Gilman's Point on the rim of the crater, which is roughly a 1.5 hour hike from Uhuru Peak. Trekkers who follow the Southern Circuit will reach the summit via Stella Point which is about an hour from the summit. Both these compare with the Rongai route where the trip to the summit can be over two hours making for a very long summit day.

Another route is the Western Breach, which includes short sections of scrambling (where hands are required for balance and support). The rock on Kilimanjaro though is highly fragmented and deaths from rockfall from above have happened.

On all the southern routes and on the Western Breach climb it is possible to sleep overnight in the crater. This has three major advantages. First, it is possible to reach the summit during the day, avoiding the midnight rush. Second, there is time to visit the crater and explore the glaciers. Finally, it is possible to get back to the rim very early the next day to see the sunrise. The Furtwängler Glacier on Kilimanjaro is a remnant of the ice cap that once covered the mountain. This has retreated dramatically over the last century with over 80% glacial retreat. The glacier is named after Walter Furtwängler, who along with Ziegfried Koenig, were the fourth to ascend to the summit of Kilimanjaro in 1912.

At the summit, there is a sign posted by the Tanzanian government. The sign (printed in English only) reads "Congratulations! You are now at Uhuru Peak, Tanzania, 5,895 m. AMSL. Africa's Highest Point. World's Highest Free-Standing Mountain." It formerly had a fourth part of the sign, which read, "One of World's Largest Volcanos. Welcome." The sign is covered in travel stickers from past trekkers who have left their mark on the top of the peak. Near this sign is a box containing a log that many trekkers have signed.

Climbing routes

Machame

 Nicknamed the "Whiskey" route because the route is popularized as somewhat difficult and more expensive than the Marangu route. On an overall comparison of the routes to scale Kilimanjaro, this is one of the best routes to take, both in terms of acclimatization and cost. In certain sections this route is steeper than the Marangu and Rongai routes and physically more demanding but is easier overall.
 Great for acclimatization with many walk high, sleep low opportunities	
 Challenging trek with scenery through five diverse climatic zones
 Good opportunity to split pre-summit day climb to leave climbers rested before summiting	
 A popular trail
 Fully catered camping only
 Requires 6–7 days for climbing.

Marangu
 Nicknamed the "Coca-Cola" route because the route is popularized as easy and cheap. This, however, is a misconception as the route is more difficult due to the 'not as good acclimatization profile' as Machame/Rongai/Lemosho routes.
 Often selected by unprepared, inexperienced climbers because of its reputation for being the "easiest" route, attributing to the lower success rate
 The shortest and cheapest route, but less time to acclimatize, therefore lower success rate	
 Dormitory style accommodation	in huts
 Less scenic due to ascent and descent on same route

Shira / Lemosho
 High summit success rate. Good for acclimatization, especially on the longer itineraries	
 Remote and spectacular, dramatic gorges and views of west Kilimanjaro
 Converges with Machame on day 4 at Baranco
 Shira offers higher start point compared to Lemosho and poorer acclimatisation
 Fully catered camping only

The Lemosho route approaches Kilimanjaro from the west. Rather than simply intersecting Shira Plateau (like Machame), Lemosho crosses it from Shira Ridge to Shira 2 Camp, in a pleasant hike. Climbers encounter low traffic until the route joins the Machame route. Afterwards, Lemosho follows the same route through Lava Tower, Barranco and Barafu, known as the southern circuit.  There are several options to complete the trek over 6, 7, or 8 days based on experience.

Rongai
 Only northern approach to Kilimanjaro
 Offers a true wilderness experience on the early stages of the climb
 Very tough final summit night from the north
 Fewer acclimatisation opportunities
 Less scenic and flat than other routes

Also known as the Nalemuru route.  Although the scenery is not as varied as the western routes, Rongai makes up for this by passing through true wilderness areas for days before joining the Marangu route at Kibo camp. Rongai is a moderately difficult route, and is highly recommended, especially for those with less backpacking experience. There are different options to complete the climb in 5, 6, or 7 days.

Umbwe
 Steep, short route with lower success rate
 Poor acclimatization because of rapid ascent
 Very remote and quiet
 Fully catered camping only

Of all the routes, Umbwe is by far the most scenic albeit steeper route up the mountain. The Rongai is the easiest camping route and the Marangu is also easy, but accommodation is in huts. As a result, this route tends to be very busy and ascent and descent routes are the same. Although the Rongai route is a flatter walk, it offers less opportunities for acclimatisation. The Machame and Lemosho routes both allow better opportunities to "walk high and sleep low", which is critical to avoiding altitude sickness.

Northern Circuit 
 Longest route up Kilimanjaro - good for acclimatization
 Only route to traverse all of the Northern Slopes on a circumnavigation of the mountain
 Fully catered camping only

The Northern Circuit is the newest route up Kilimanjaro and also the longest. It takes a minimum of 8 days to complete but most operators offer the 9 day option. Because of its length, the Northern Circuit has the highest summit success rate. The route follows the same as the Lemosho Route for the first two days and then veers off to circle around the quieter northern slopes to the east side of the mountain. There a number of route variations, but generally the Northern Circuit approaches the summit via Gilman's Point before descending on the same route as the Machame and Lemosho.

Trekking routes 

Kilimanjaro has a number of official climbing routes. These are:
Northern Circuit,
Machame,
Marangu,
Rongai,
Londorossi Lemosho,
Umbwe,
Shira, and
Mweka (descent only).

Summary of routes

Northern Circuit 
The Northern Circuit is the newest route on Kilimanjaro and takes 8–9 days.  It begins from the north, then traverses nearly the entire mountain clockwise before approaching the summit from the east.  This route offers diverse views, making a particularly scenic route. Being a lengthy, wilderness route, and the only route to cross the northern face, there is very little traffic on this route. Its length means that it provides more acclimatisation time than other routes.

Registration for the route is at Londorossi Gate, with the trek itself beginning at the road head at Lemosho Glades and following a little used track called Chamber's Route. The route then follows around the northern face of the mountain, crossing the high desert plateau of Shira Caldera and passing Shira Cathedral to reach Moir Valley and then Buffalo Ridge. From here, the route climbs onto The Saddle, a lunar landscape which stretches between Kibo and Mawenzi Peaks. The overnight ascent to the summit is made from School Hut campsite to the crater rim at Gilman's Point, from where a trail leads on to the summit of Kilimanjaro at Uruhu Peak. Descent from the summit is made via Stella Point, Barafu Camp, and Millennium Camp, leaving the park at Mweka Gate.

Lemosho route
This is an unspoilt, remote and less-used way up to the Shira Plateau. Trekkers sometimes use it to ascend the Western Breach route or follow it with the Kibo South Circuit to ascend by the easier Barafu Route. The first day of the route hardly ever has any game animals, and armed rangers never accompany a group.

The standard route takes 8 days on the mountain, and is sometimes extended to 9 days with a stay at Karanga Valley.

Route Outline
 Drive from Moshi or Arusha to Londorossi Park Gate. From here a forest track requiring a four-wheel drive vehicle leads to Lemosho Glades and a possible campsite (park fees are not paid to camp here). Walk along forest trails to Mti Mkubwa (big tree) campsite,.
 The trail gradually steepens and enters the giant heather moorland zone. Several streams are crossed then it gains the Shira Ridge at about ( and drops gently down to Shira 1 camp located by a stream on the Shira Plateau ((). This campsite could be omitted.
 A gentle walk across the plateau leads to Shira 2 camp on moorland meadows by a stream ((). A variety of walks are available on the plateau making this an excellent acclimatization day.
 Continue east towards Kibo passing the junction, then east towards the Lava Tower. Shortly after this, descend to Barranco hut (().
 A short scramble to the top of the Great Barranco and then a traverse over scree and ridges to the Karanga Valley ((), beneath the icefalls of the Heim, Kersten, and Decken Glaciers. After climbing out of the Karanga Valley, the trail ascends a ridge to the Barafu Hut, a bleak location with little vegetation at (.
 An early start for the ascent to the rim of the Kibo Crater between the Rebmann and Ratzel Glaciers. The last section before the rim can sometimes be snow-covered and an ice-axe or ski stick is useful for balance. At the rim, Stella point is reached (18,652 feet (5,685 m)).  From here, a further hour leads to Uhuru Peak, from where there are often fine views of Meru to the west and the jagged peak of Mawenzi to the east. Descend to the Barafu Hut for a rest and lunch before continuing on past Millenium camp down to camp at Mweka Hut in the giant heather zone on the forest edge. Those with energy on the summit may wish to descend to the Reutsh Crater and visit the ice pinnacles of the Eastern Icefields.
 A 3-4 hour descent through forest brings climbers to the park gate.

The Lemosho route approaches from the Western side of the mountain and is less frequented than other popular Kilimanjaro routes. It is effectively a variant of the Machame route with only the first 2 days of the trek differing. The acclimatisation profile of the Lemosho route is great, with repeated climb high sleep low opportunities throughout leading to high success rates. Most people complete the Lemosho route in 7 days, but it can be extended by one day to give climbers a little longer to acclimatise if needed. Camping is the only available option for the Lemosho route.

Machame route

The Machame route as of 2006 is described here.  The route is typically done on a six- or seven-day hike.

The campsites and gates (with corresponding elevations) are as follows:
 Machame Gate (start of trek) 
 Machame 
 Shira 
 Barranco 
 Karanga (optional camp, used by 7-day climbers)
 Barafu (high camp before summit) 
 Mweka (descent) 
 Mweka Gate (end of trek) 

One benefit of the Machame route is its quick rise to relatively high elevations (~), and a short ascent to the Lava Tower site (~) before descending back to Barranco Camp (~) on the same day.  This follows the climber's adage "climb high, sleep low", and helps altitude acclimation.  The initial steep ascent also helps trekkers acclimatise better.

The Machame route starts from Machame Gate and travels upwards through the montane rainforest, characterized by dense vegetation, a muddy trail, and short sections of steep climbs. The first campsite, Machame Camp, is right after the dense tree cover in an area with lower but still thick bushlands.

The second day continues through increasingly sparse trees and bushes into moorlands. The day finishes with Shira Camp, which is on a small plateau in the high moorlands, and features views of Kibo in the northeast and Mount Meru towards the west. White necked ravens can be seen throughout the day.  There is also a set of small caves a short walk from the campsite known as the Shira Caves.

The third day starts in the moorlands and moves into alpine desert, with fewer trees and more rocks. The highest point is the base of the Lava Tower, after which the trail descends into the Barranco Valley. More vegetation is present in this zone, especially the area just before the campsite. This area is called the "Garden of the Senecios", which features many of the huge senecio plants. Shorter lobelia plants are also present.

The fourth day starts with the ascent of the Barranco Wall, which is considered a scramble in climbing terms. The trail continues with many up and down sections across small streams and rivulets and finally crosses the Karanga River to the Karanga campsite.

The fifth day follows the path up and across a rocky zone, finishing at the high camp Barafu.  Very little vegetation can be found on the inhospitable terrain. A field of sedimentary rocks litters the ground. (Note - the six-day trek omits the Karanga campsite, and trekkers continue directly to Barafu on the same day.)

The summit is usually attempted on the very early morning of the sixth day (around midnight).  Barafu is also used as a summit campsite for the Umbwe route. Trekkers typically take somewhere between five and seven hours to ascend, using headlamps and cold weather gear. Making the ascent on a full moon or shortly thereafter can make the headtorch unnecessary. The first milestone, generally reached shortly after dawn, is Stella Point, which is on the crater rim.  Following Stella Point, the trail continues for another 60 minutes to Uhuru Peak, the summit.

The descent back to Barafu takes roughly four hours. Some trekkers scree slide down the slope, which entails skidding/running down the loose gravel at medium speed. From Barafu, trekkers typically take a short break, and continue downwards through the alpine desert and ensuing moorlands to Mweka Camp.

The seventh and final day has trekkers continue through the montane forest to Mweka Gate.  Troops of black-and-white colobus monkeys can often be seen in the dense growth.

Detailed description:

Marangu Route

The Marangu Route (also known as the "Coca-Cola" route) is the easiest ascent of Kilimanjaro, although any ascent can be challenging. Climbs can be done over 6 days. From the summit, glaciers, screes, cliffs, afro-alpine moorland, and forests lead down to the cultivated foothills.

The Marangu route is a favourite of local tour operators as it's the shortest route and requires no camping gear to be carried. For this reason it is often the cheapest option. Because of its short profile, the Marangu route actually has the lowest summit success rate out of any route.

Trekkers sometimes spend an extra day to acclimate to the altitude at Horombo Hut. Also, trekkers often start the final ascent to Uhuru Peak early from Kibo Hut, because the scree is easier to climb when frozen, and dawn views from the crater rim are often spectacular.

Route Outline
 Drive to Marangu Gate. Walk through the rain forest to Mandara hut.
 Leave the forest and cross open moor land to Horombo hut.
 Rest and acclimatisation day at Horombo Hut. Day walk to Zebra Rocks or to Mawenzi Hut. This day can be omitted.
 Walk through moorland then alpine desert to "The Saddle" between the peaks of Mawenzi and Kibo. From here it takes about an hour to reach Kibo hut.
 Very early start for the summit on steep scree up to Gillman's Point, which is on the crater rim. Continue around the rim (which will take about two hours for fit climbers) to Uhuru Peak the highest point in Africa. Descend to Kibo Hut and then down to the thicker air and relative warmth of Horombo hut.
 Descend to Marangu gate.

Rongai Route

Route Outline

The route described below includes the 'Mawenzi Tarn Hut variation' which is recommended for acclimatization.  However, some tours skip this and proceed directly from Simba camp to a 'Third Camp' at around 3700m to Kibo Hut, resulting in a (more difficult because of shorter length) 5-day total trip.

 Drive 2 hours from the Marangu gate to the Rongai Gate. The walk is initially through plantations then rain forest and finally bush country.
A gentle day through bush then heathers.
 Gentle rising traverse through moorland over several ridges to Kikelea Caves, .
 Moorland then screes to Mawenzi Tarn Hut, .
 Easy angled screes slopes lead across the Saddle to Kibo Hut, .
 Very early start for the summit on steep scree up to Gillman's Point, which is on the crater rim. Continue around the rim (which will take about two hours for fit climbers) to Uhuru Peak, the highest point in Africa. Descend to Kibo Hut and then down to the thicker air and relative warmth of Horombo hut.
 Descend to Marangu gate.

Climbers often omit the second cave during ascent, although the climb is more difficult.

Umbwe Route

The Umbwe route is often considered the hardest but most spectacular and direct way to reach Uhuru Peak.

Route Outline
The route initially follows a forestry track winding up through the natural rain forest. It then narrows and steepens to climb the ridge between the Lonzo and Umbwe rivers.
 Shortly after leaving the camp, the forest ends and the path continues along a narrow spectacular ridge. Above, the sheer  of the Breach Wall appears and disappears as the afternoon mists roll up the Great Barranco.
 From here the route parts. The traditional route continues north to climb the Western Breach from the Arrow Glacier Camp.  However, because of the high risk from falling rock, it is suggested to follow the route below.
 A short scramble to the top of the Great Barranco and then a traverse over scree and ridges to the Karanga Valley, beneath the icefalls of the Heim, Kersten, and Decken Glaciers.
 An early start for the ascent to the rim of the Kibo Crater between the Rebmann and Ratzel Glaciers. The last section before the rim can sometimes be snow-covered and an ice-axe or ski stick is useful for balance. From here, a further hour leads to Uhuru Peak, from where there are often fine views of Meru to the west and the jagged peak of Mawenzi to the east. After a short time on the summit, descend to the Barafu Hut before continuing on down to camp at Mweka Hut in the giant heather zone on the Mweka route.
 A 3-4 hour descent through forest brings climbers to the park gate.

Acclimatization on Kilimanjaro 
7,8 and 9-day climbing programs are recommended because of the altitude adaptation zone concept.

The concept  of acclimatization zone refers to a certain altitude span, where a climber does not feel the symptoms of altitude mountain sickness.

To illustrate, for many people the first acclimatization zone is 3000 m/9842 f - 3800 m/ 12467 f. That means that having reached the lower point, and spending some time there, a person will be comfortable staying within this range. In order to ascend higher, however, this person needs to spend a night at 3700 m/12139 f in order to widen this span.

Broadening the one's acclimatization zone involves some discomfort, which fades away over the time. For example, feeling small headache and nausea upon arrival to Mti Mkubwa Camp (3095 m/ 10155 f) is common. Spending a night there will most likely reduce or neutralize them altogether, meaning that the body got accustomed to this zone.

The longer program taken – the more time the body has for broadening the borders of this zone, and the less discomfort will be experienced in the course of the acclimatization process. Making small altitude increases every day will be much less stressful than if making 'elevation jumps'. Thus, it is very recommended to make altitude acclimatization times as long as possible.

It is most effective to spend an additional night at an intermediate altitude (3400m-4700m). This is high enough to stimulate the necessary physiological changes of acclimatization for Kilimanjaro, without overstressing the body. Light walks and drinking plenty during acclimatization day is recommended.

Climbing routes – costs 
It is necessary to trek with a licensed guide. There is no option to climb solo. Taking into consideration permit fees, park fees, camping and food logistics, the only realistic way to climb the mountain is with a tour operator.

In 2016, the Ministry of Tourism in Tanzania made all tourist related business VAT-able. As a result, costs have gone up 18% across the board. Many price indications online are thus outdated.

A decent ethical climb by an authorized local no-frills operator on a short 6-day route may start from around US$1,500 when climbing with a group. However, the 5 or 6 day routes also have the lowest summit success rates and are thus not recommended. For a responsible 7-day climb, a reasonable budget is at least US$1,800 to $2,000.

Several  factors determine the prices directly. First is the quality of the tour operator which in a way also determines the safety levels on the climb. There are many companies that may not be on popular travel websites and yet provide great service with quality equipment and high safety standards for relatively cheaper rates.

Second is how the crew is treated and paid by the operator. Exploitation of porters is a big problem on the mountain. Tourism being the main source of jobs in Kilimanjaro region has resulted in high competition for porter jobs. Mostly it is the local operators operating at cut-throat or loss-making prices that pay their porters below minimum wage and make them to carry gear that is too heavy. The good operators are cognizant about this problem and provide the minimum stipulated salaries and operate according to Kilimanjaro National Park regulations which uphold ethical and fair treatment of the crew.

Since even the minimum stipulated wages are not enough, a tipping culture has been established on Kilimanjaro treks. While poor quality operators may recommend tips of only around $150–200 per climber, this is most likely not sufficient to ensure a fair compensation for porters. Depending on the length or the climb, group size, climbing package and base salaries paid by the tour operator, it is best to budget at least $250 to $500 for tipping. The irony is that ethical operators recommend higher tipping amounts and are thus perceived as more expensive, while the recommended tipping should actually be a lot higher by operators who do not pay fair wages in order to ensure a fair total compensation. Be aware of that when comparing prices.

Rock climbing routes

The rock on Kilimanjaro is generally unsuitable for rock climbing; however, there are several good snow and ice routes that are rapidly vanishing due to glacial recession. Mawenzi's peaks provide a few rock routes on loose rock.

Until recently, glacial recession has made it harder to ascend the Umbwe Route followed by the Heim Glacier. Just left of the glacier, the Breach Wall was considered the hardest route on Kilimanjaro (featuring a 100 m high vertical icicle). Further left again, the Western Breach (Arrow Glacier) Route provides an easy scrambling route to the crater.

Park authorities and outfitters require special arrangements and often disclaimers to climb these routes. Although it is only a scramble, the Western Breach route falls into this category on account of rock fall danger.

Selected rock climbing routes
 Heim Glacier: A Nelson, H J Cooke, D N Goodall, 1957. Grade III+, 12 hours.
 Western Breach: Grade I, 6 hours. The easiest rock-climbing way on the south-west side of the mountain.
 Mawenzi aka South Peak: First climbed in 1924 by George Londt from South Africa.

References

Kilimanjaro
Climbing Routes